The 1994 Caribbean Cup (known as the Shell Caribbean Cup for sponsorship reasons) was the sixth edition of the Caribbean Cup, the football championship of the Caribbean, one of the CONCACAF zones. The final stage was hosted by Trinidad and Tobago.

Qualifying Tournament

Regulation
An unusual rule was imposed in the qualifying tournament: every match was required to have a winner. If the two teams had the same score after 90 minutes, they played a sudden death extra time in which the golden goal was counted as two goals. If no team scored in the extra time, then a penalty shootout determined the winner.

Group 1

Anomaly

Grenada went into the match with a superior goal difference, meaning that Barbados needed to win by at least two goals to progress to the finals. Barbados exploited two unusual rules variations in its final group stage game. First, unlike most group stages in football competitions, the organizers had deemed that all games must have a winner. All games drawn over 90 minutes would go to sudden death extra time. The second unusual rule stated that in sudden death extra time, the golden goal would count as two goals.

Barbados was leading 2–0 until the 83rd minute, when Grenada scored, making it 2–1. Approaching the dying moments, the Barbadians realized they had little chance of scoring past Grenada's mass defense in the time available, so they deliberately scored an own goal to tie the game at 2–2. This would send the game into extra time and give them another half-hour to break down the defense. The Grenadians realized what was happening and attempted to score an own goal as well, which would put Barbados back in front by one goal and would eliminate Barbados from the competition.

The Barbados players started defending their opposition's net to prevent them from doing this, and during the game's last five minutes, Grenada tried to score in either net while Barbados defended both ends of the pitch. Barbados successfully held off Grenada for the final five minutes, sending the game into extra time. In extra time, Barbados scored the game winner, and was awarded a 4–2 victory, which put them through to the next round.

Group 2
Played in Saint Vincent and the Grenadines.

Group 3
Played in Suriname

Group 4
Played in Saint Kitts and Nevis

The winner of this match should have had more goal difference than Dominica but since Dominica did appear in the final tournament, it is most likely that the match wasn't played at all.

The match between was cancelled because of crowd trouble.

Group 5
Played in Cayman Islands

Group 6

 withdrew.

Final tournament

First round
Played in Trinidad and Tobago.

Group A

Group B

Semi-finals

3rd place match

Final

Haiti national team defection attempt

Many in the Haitian national team did not want to return to Haiti following the events of the 1991 Haitian coup d'état, where Army General Raoul Cédras had led a military coup. Several Haitian players had criticized the coup d'état on a Miami-based radio station, and their messages had been played in Haiti.

Guy Delva, a journalist who was reporting on the Haitian players at the time said, "I'm wondering if they really understand the gravity of the statements they made," and it was felt by some that the players and their immediate families were in danger.

Following the Haitian team's exit from the competition, sixteen members of the national football team sought political asylum at the U.S. Embassy in Port of Spain on 14 April. They were told by embassy officials to apply from Haiti or the United States. Goalkeeper Jacques Tomaney claimed that six of his friends had already been killed in Haiti. Upon being told to return to Haiti, defender Patrick Nertilus said "We are very happy to be going home. We are the stars in our country".

References

Caribbean Cup
Caribbean Cup
Ca
International association football competitions hosted by Trinidad and Tobago